Sara Allen Plummer (September 3, 1836 – January 15, 1923) was an American botanist. Mount Lemmon in Arizona is named for her, as she was the first white woman to ascend it. She was responsible for the designation of the golden poppy (Eschscholzia californica) as the state flower of California, in 1903. A number of plants are also named in her honor, including the new genus Plummera (now placed as a subgenus within Hymenoxys), described by Harvard University botanist Asa Gray in 1882.

Early years
She was born in New Gloucester, Maine on September 3, 1836.  She was educated in Massachusetts at the Female College of Worcester. Plummer then moved to New York City, teaching art there for some years, and studying at Cooper Union. She also served as a nurse for a year or two during the Civil War.

Move to California

Falling ill in 1868–69, she moved to California in 1869, after hearing from her friend how the trip helped his health. Newspapers of the day described Plummer as "one of the first 'intellectuals'" to move to Santa Barbara, Indeed, in 1871 she established a lending library that became an important cultural center for Santa Barbara. Shortly after arriving in Santa Barbara, she established the "Lending Library and Stationery Depot", with the aid of a friend, Unitarian minister Henry Bellows, who helped her acquire her first few hundred volumes. Operating out of a jewelry store on State Street, Plummer charged $5 membership or 10 cents for borrowing books, and sold a variety of art and music supplies, and held cultural gatherings including lectures and art exhibits. She became a member of the Pacific Coast Women's Press Association.

While walking about Santa Barbara, she acquired an interest in botany, and turned her painting towards botanical illustration. In 1876 Plummer met John Gill (J.G.) Lemmon (1831–1908) when he was giving a lecture in Santa Barbara. Lemmon, a Civil War veteran and former Andersonville prisoner, was, like Plummer, a self-trained botanist. The couple started corresponding via letters and Lemmon tutored her in botany. She also sent him a shrub she had found near Santa Barbara, and after a friend of his examined it, named it Baccharis plummerae in honor of her. In 1880 they married, Plummer assuming his name. At that point, she sold her library to the Odd Fellows to operate, and she and John Lemmon began traveling and cataloging botanical discoveries.

Lemmon and her husband John honeymooned in the Santa Catalina Mountains near Tucson, Arizona at her recommendation. With the aid of E. O. Stratton, they eventually scaled the tallest peak, which they named Mount Lemmon in her honor – one of the few mountains named for a woman. While on their trip, the Lemmons endured several hardships, yet managed to discover and catalog a number of species unique to the mountain.

After returning from their trip, they continued their botanical endeavors. The Lemmons co-developed the Lemmon Herbarium at their home at No. 5985 Telegraph Avenue, later donating it to UC Berkeley, where it was later merged into and called the University and Jepson Herbaria.  Lemmon continued her botanical illustrations, including as the official artist for the California State Board of Forestry (from 1888 to 1892) and acquired a national reputation for her work. In 1882, she discovered a new genus of plants called Plummera floribunda. In 1893, she lectured on forest conservation at the World's Columbian Exposition in Chicago. During the 1890s she also advocated for the adoption of the golden poppy as the state flower of California, eventually writing the bill passed by the California Legislature and signed in 1903.

Death
Her husband J.G. died in 1908, and Sara Plummer Lemmon died in California in 1923. The couple is buried at Mountain View Cemetery in Oakland, in Plot 46, with a poppy on her gravestone.

Selected bibliography
Sara Plummer Lemmon, "The Ferns of the Pacific Slope" (San Francisco, 1882)
"Silk Culture in California" (1884)
"Marine Botany" (1886)
Marine Algae of the West
Western Ferns
and John Gill Lemmon, How to Tell the Trees and Forest Endowment of Pacific Slope (1902)

Notes

Further reading
The Tucson Citizen, June 30, 1905 (account of scaling of Mount Lemmon)
Frank S. Crosswhite, "'J. G. Lemmon & Wife,' Plant Explorers in Arizona, California, and Nevada", Desert Plants, v.1 (August 1979), pp. 12–22.
Joseph Ewan, "Sara Allen Plummer Lemmon and Her 'Ferns of the Pacific Coast'", American Midland Naturalist, v.32, n.2 (Sep. 1944), pp. 513–518.
Suzanne Hensel, Look at the Mountains (a history of the Santa Catalina Mountains)
John and Sara (Plummer) Lemmon Papers, University and Jepson Herbaria Archives, University of California, Berkeley
J. G. Lemmon, "A Botanical Wedding-Trip", The Californian, v.4 (Dec. 1881), pp. 517–525.
 David Leighton, "Street Smarts: Highway, mountain named for botanist," Arizona Daily Star, January 05, 2015

External links

American explorers
Botanical illustrators
1836 births
1923 deaths
American women botanists
American mountain climbers
Female climbers
Female explorers
Artists from California
Artists from Maine
Writers from California
Writers from Maine
People from New Gloucester, Maine
People from Santa Barbara, California
Burials at Mountain View Cemetery (Oakland, California)
19th-century American botanists
20th-century American botanists
19th-century American painters
20th-century American painters
19th-century American women scientists
20th-century American women scientists
American Civil War nurses
American women nurses
Pacific Coast Women's Press Association